The Complex Engineering Systems Institute (ISCI), housed at Universidad de Chile and having Pontificia Universidad Católica de Chile as an associate institution, brings together a group of top researchers from eight Chilean universities. Each of the researchers has been invited to join ISCI in view of their academic merit and for their existing or potential synergy with other ISCI members. This is the case with the 58 current ISCI members, who come from the Universidad de Chile, Pontificia Universidad Católica de Chile, Universidad de Santiago de Chile, Universidad Diego Portales, Universidad Adolfo Ibáñez, Universidad de los Andes, Universidad de Talca, and Universidad de Concepción.

The researchers' group was formed on 24 January 2007 with two main goals. First, to define a solid set of engineering research areas that are both coherent and complementary, where all types of infrastructure interact with human behavior. Second, to establish a worldwide reference in Engineering research and education outside the USA and Europe, leading to a better understanding of relevant problems and attracting high-level, young researchers.

This group has gained international recognition due to the quality of the research performed by its members. An important part of this work is performed jointly with researchers from other prestigious academic organizations abroad, through formal and personal collaboration networks. It prioritizes local synergy and nationwide impact, and the influence of its members has increased in relevant decision-making agents both in the industry and in public institutions.

Research Groups

Natural Resources 

Natural resources are the main area of exports for Chile. A major concern for the Institute has therefore been to develop projects for these industries that are both innovative and have high impact, as well as carrying out basic research. This department works with three industries: Forestry, Mining, and Salmon Farming. The work carried out led to the INFORMS (US Society for Operations Research and Management Sciences) Edelman Prize in 1998. In terms of methodological developments, the Institute addresses such problems as the integration of the forest supply chain, spatial environmental considerations in harvesting, stochastic elements in markets, and future climate change. One paper in this area was selected as the best of 2013 in the ENRE (Energy and Natural Resources) category of INFORMS.

In Mining, ISCI develops models for extraction planning in conjunction with Chile’s Codelco, the biggest copper mining company in the world. The systems developed since the early 2000s – both for open pit and underground mines – are used by the several of Codelco's mines. The application of these models has resulted in important and well-documented savings for the company. A paper presenting these results was selected as the Best Paper of 2014 in INFORMS's ENRE category. The Institute is currently developing systems to support decision-making at operational level.

In terms of production, Chile's Salmon Farming Industry is second only to Norway on the world stage. The Institute works with several salmon farming companies on the development of models for parts of the supply chain, daily operations, and logistics.

Transport 

ISCI research in Transport represents the intention behind the design of the organization by developing methodologies and contributing to a rigorous understanding of the relationships between transport system design and the behavior of users and operators, in order to conceive, plan and regulate these systems and improve the way they function. The Institute researches travel choice models (mode, destination) and the evaluation of qualitative aspects (comfort, overcrowding), the study of the time use and its evaluation (transport, work, leisure), the interaction between location and transport, the role of social networks, the analysis of walking and cycling as special modes of travel, the design, planning and pricing of public and private transport networks, specific aspects of the payment for urban travel (multi-journey travel cards, fare evasion), and optimal social policies in urban, maritime and air transport.

Markets, Organization and Regulation (MORe) 

ISCI's Markets, Organization and Regulation (MORe) group – formerly known as Industrial Organization (IO) – specializes in the study of situations in which it is essential to understand how people and organizations react strategically to the actions of other agents in the environment in which they move. It studies how different alternatives in the design and regulation of markets and organizations affect the wellbeing of consumers, citizens, and, in the last instance, social welfare. Under this viewpoint, the group contributes to the discussion on such matters as free competition, the assignment of resources in the absence of financial markets, and policies to boost productivity and innovation. More group researchers focus on developing and analyzing regulatory mechanisms in key areas for the country like free competition, public concessions, transport, and innovation. The focus of the group anticipates the reaction of agents to the regulation, which in turn improves the prediction of the effects and costs of the regulation, thus allowing the authority to plan for the long term.

Energy 

The ISCI energy group is interested in the development of renewable energies in Chile and the electricity sector as a whole. Researchers of the Energy group make both theoretical and applied contributions. In the area of theory contributions is worth to mention a methodology to perform the network constrained economic dispatch optimization problem; a stochastic perturbation model to deal with uncertainties of power system stability; an optimal allocation algorithm of wind turbines by considering transmission security constraints, and new applications of smart grids in remote areas of the country.

Location and Logistics 

The group concentrates on three subjects: infrastructure and equipment location; logistics including supply chain, and land use. The location line includes the location of public infrastructure as schools and prisons, hired by the public organizations in charge of these systems. After the large earthquake in 2010, the school project focused on developing a decision making tool for deciding what urban and rural schools to reconstruct, successfully used by the Government.

ISCI also addresses other public and private location problems, in sectors that go from waste management to TV transmitting antennas. The logistics line of research results in an important reduction of the time required to attending emergencies by the firefighting system, as well as time and cost savings for private companies and public systems. ISCI also collaborates with the Chilean police in both the design of beat districts and the model and parameters used for determining strategic resource needs.

In the land use line, ISCI designs models for a best land allocation; prediction of urban land use and the effect of any new developments, e.g., transportation systems.

Smartcities 

ISCI's Smartcities group sets the challenge of using the technological tools and information available to generate developments that allow it to contribute directly to the improvement of the quality of life in cities. One such line of work is the use of real-time information to deliver recommendations to users that allow them to make better travel decisions. Another is the use of communication technologies in favor of sustainable transport. The use of sensors to study traveler behavior, the study of tele-managed smart light networks, and the impact of electric and autonomous vehicles are other examples of lines of work.

The interdisciplinary work brings important achievements. Developments include the Transapp application (available for Android and IOS), which allows users to receive and provide information on the status of the transport system. ADATRAP software allows transportation authorities to use historical information to monitor the system and make planning decisions, and the COMMANDER software is used for the dispatch of emergency vehicles.

Data Science 

The Data Science group at ISCI is composed of faculty members from different Chilean universities and from different research areas. Data mining, web mining, Internet of Things, metaheuristics are some of the fields where this group is active in teaching and research. Its members applied the respective techniques in projects for e.g. health analytics, crime analytics, education, business analytics. Fundamental research is being performed for feature selection, dynamic data mining, evolutionary algorithms, ubiquitous computing, among others. This group also disseminates research, development, and applications related to data science through conferences, seminars, and executive education courses.

Consumer Analytics 

This group focuses on the study of managerial decisions using empirical and normative models to characterize behavior and decision-making process of agents, which play a key role to improve the efficiency of the system. To analyze such systems, agent decisions are modeled using methods from a broad set of disciplines, including operations research, microeconomics, behavioral economics and consumer psychology.

The group has several research projects in collaboration with industry and public institutions, including: large big-box retail chains, retail banking, hotels, restaurants, hospitals, online market platforms, government procurement agencies, judicial courts, airlines, antitrust regulation, consumer protection agencies, among many more. Several of these projects have led to actual implementations that are currently been used in practice.

The group has an active research network with scholars from top business and engineering schools, such as Harvard, Chicago, Stanford, Columbia, MIT, and others. The annual “Management Science Workshop” organized by the group has become an internationally recognized conference attended by top scholars across the world.

Participating Institutions

Funding 

 Programa de Financiamiento Basal del Programa de Investigación Asociativa de CONICYT

Host Institution

Associate Institution 

 Pontificia Universidad Católica de Chile

Other Participating Institutions 

 Universidad de Santiago de Chile
 Universidad de Los Andes
 Universidad Diego Portales
 Universidad Adolfo Ibáñez
 Universidad de Talca
 Universidad de Concepción
 ENAP
 DTPM

References

External links 
 Complex Engineering Systems Institute (ISCI) official website

Universities in Chile